A colonial order of chivalry was an order of chivalry awarded by European colonial states in Africa and Asia for those who conquered and administered their territories.  They were sometimes adopted by post-colonial successor states, or remained one of the former imperial power's orders of chivalry. The orders of the states of the Commonwealth are not colonial orders, and owe their existence to their nations' personal union with the United Kingdom or to their own governments or parliaments.

Belgium
Order of the African Star (1888)
Royal Order of the Lion (1891)
Order of the Crown (1897)
Order of Leopold II (1900)

France
Royal Order of Cambodia (1864)
Order of the Star of Anjouan (1874)
Order of the Dragon of Annam (1886)
Order of Nichan El-Anouar (1887)
Order of the Black Star (1889)

Italy
Colonial Order of the Star of Italy (1914)

Portugal
Order of the Empire (1932)

Netherlands
The Netherlands had no colonial orders, even though governors-general of the Dutch East Indies often called for such orders to be created.  There were numerous other awards for service in the Dutch East Indies, the most notable being the establishment of the Cross for Courage and Fidelity and the Star for Loyalty and Merit.

Spain
Order of Africa (1933)

United Kingdom
Most Distinguished Order of Saint Michael and Saint George (1818) Originally for Malta and the Ionian islands, later Empire-wide
Most Exalted Order of the Star of India (1861)
Most Eminent Order of the Indian Empire (1877)
Imperial Order of the Crown of India (1878) Female only
Order of Burma (1940)